

The Whitcraft Model 165 was an American single-seat homebuilt sporting aircraft designed by Mickey Whittenburg and built by him over a ten-year period, first flying in 1965.

Design
The Model 165 is a strut-braced, low-wing monoplane with a welded steel-tube fuselage with a fabric covering. The wing is a conventional light alloy structure with a fabric covering with vee-bracing strut on each side, ailerons but no flaps. The aircraft is powered by a  Continental A-65 air-cooled engine driving a two-bladed fixed-pitch tractor propeller. The pilot has an enclosed cockpit with a rearward-sliding transparent canopy, the landing gear is a fixed tailwheel type.

Specifications

References

Notes

Bibliography

1960s United States civil utility aircraft
Homebuilt aircraft
Low-wing aircraft
Single-engined tractor aircraft
Aircraft first flown in 1965